Pancole is a village in Tuscany, central Italy,  administratively a frazione of the comune of Scansano, province of Grosseto. At the time of the 2001 census its population amounted to 308.

Pancole is about 22 km from Grosseto and 6 km from Scansano, and it is situated in a plain on a hill along the Scansanese Provincial Road.

Main sights 
 Santissimo Nome di Maria, main parish church of the village, it was built in 1688. The little chapel of Sacro Cuore di Gesù is annexed to the church.
 Chapel of Sant'Anna, it was built in 1827.

References

Bibliography 
 Aldo Mazzolai, Guida della Maremma. Percorsi tra arte e natura, Le Lettere, Florence, 1997.
 Giuseppe Guerrini, Torri e castelli della Provincia di Grosseto, Nuova Immagine Editrice, Siena, 1999.

See also 
 Baccinello
 Montorgiali
 Murci
 Poggioferro
 Polveraia
 Pomonte, Scansano
 Preselle

Frazioni of Scansano